Kamalpur is a town and a Nagar Panchayat in Dhalai District in the Indian state of Tripura around 93 km from the state capital Agartala. It is the largest Sub-divisional town in Dhalai District.

Geography
Kamalpur is a oldest & biggest Town of Dhalai District. It is situate in the bank of Dhalai river. The town share 53KM International border with neighbour country Bangladesh.

Climate 
This place has a Tropical climate with hot and humid summers, a prolonged rainy season and warm winters. Rains are frequent in March and April. Maximum temperatures in summers and winters are 36 degree and 28 degree Celsius respectively. The minimum temperatures in summers and winters are 17 degree and 5.3 degree Celsius respectively.

Demographics
 India census, Kamalpur had a population of 10,872 of which 5,479 are males while 5,393 are females as per report released by Census India 2011. Population of Children with age of 0-6 is 988 which is 9.09% of total population of Kamalpur (NP). In Kamalpur Nagar Panchayat, Female Sex Ratio is of 984 against state average of 960. Moreover Child Sex Ratio in Kamalpur is around 900 compared to Tripura state average of 957. Kamalpur has an average literacy rate of 97.77 higher than the national average of 87.22% In Kamalpur, Male literacy is around 98.61% while female literacy rate is 96.93%.

Politics
Kamalpur assembly constituency is part of Tripura East (Lok Sabha constituency). In Tripura assembly election it is part of Kamalpur (45) constituency. Kamalpur Nagar Panchayat constitutes 11 wards.

Education 
 There is only Two college present

1. Kamalpur Govt Degree College

2. District Institute for Education & Training

 There are many higher schools some school are

1. Kamalpur Class XII School, Kamalpur

2. Krishna Chandra Girls School, Kamalpur

3. Kamalpur Madrasha Class XII School, Kamalpur

4. Hararkola Class XII School, Herarkhola

5. Kalachari Class XII School, Kalachari No. 1

6. Harachandra Class XII School, Manikbhandar

7. Kamalpur Govt. English Medium School, Kamalpur

8. Fulchuri Class XII School, Fulchuri

Relation English Medium School, Rudreswar Das Memorial Institution  of Manikbhandar are two very popular English medium school in Kamalpur sub-division

Economy 
Mainly agriculture based with several micro- and small-scale industrial units. There is one tea garden named Ramdurlabpur Tea Estate. Rubber plantation scattered in various areas. Major market area is Kamalpur town and other small market places are in Fulchari, College chowmuhani, Kalachari and Manikbhandar.

Health care system 
Only one sub-divisional hospital named Bimal Sinha Memorial Hospital.

Transport
Road connectivity is present with Ambassa, Agartala, Khowai, Kumarghat.
Nearest railway station is Ambassa railway station. Kamalpur Airport which serves Kamalpur is currently non-operational.

Culture  
There is majority of people are follow Hinduism. Majority of people are Bengali; but other religion's people like Muslim, Christian people are also live in this place. 
The main festival of the town is Durga puja being celebrate every year,others are Diwali,  Holi, Laxmi Puja, Saraswati Puja etc. are also celebrate in Kamalpur.
Kamleshwari Kali Mandir situated in Kamalpur, is also one of the oldest (more than 100 year) temple in Tripura.

See also
 List of cities and towns in Tripura

References

Cities and towns in Dhalai district
Dhalai district